Bela Chekurishvili (born 25 December 1974) is a poet and journalist from Georgia.

Biography 
Chekurishvili was born on 25 December 1974 in Vachnadziani, Gurjaani. After finishing school she studied Georgian language and literature at Tbilisi State University. From 1998 to 2013, Chekurishvili worked as a journalist, for various magazines and newspapers in Georgia. She then began further PhD study on comparative literature, hosted by Tbilisi State University and the University of Bonn. In her spare time she is a mountaineer.

Chekurishvili's poetry was first published in 1989. She writes in Georgian and German and her work has been translated into Russian, Italian, French and English. In her poetry she depicts everyday life: from lumberjacks to prostitutes, housewives to refugees. Her poetry is published in several volumes and she has also published a volume of short stories.

Books 
 Nana's horse, Intelekti Publishing, 2020
 Barefoot, Wunderhorn Publishing, Heidelberg, 2018
 Picnic on the mountain (with linocuts by Zoppe Voskuhl), Corvinus Presse Berlin, 2018 
 Detector of nudity, Intelekti Publishing, 2016
 We, the Apple trees, Wunderhorn Publishing, Heidelberg, 2016
 Tales from the banks of the Rhine, Intelekti Publishing, 2016
 Sisyphus' Question, Diogene Publishing, 2012
 Postcards, Meridiani Publishing, 2009
 Either – Or, Leta Publishing, 1998

References

External links 
 Bela Chekurishvili
 Wir, Die Apfelbäume
 An Sisyphos – სიზიფეს
 Bela Chekurishvili´s corner

1974 births
Living people
Poets from Georgia (country)
Journalists from Tbilisi
Women poets from Georgia (country)
Women writers from Georgia (country)
Tbilisi State University alumni
Postmodern writers